Martin Pazdera (born 26 September 1976) is a retired Czech midfielder.

References

1976 births
Living people
Czech footballers
FK Chmel Blšany players
Association football midfielders